Chupampa is a corregimiento in Santa María District, Herrera Province, Panama with a population of 1,231 as of 2010. Its population as of 1990 was 2,448; its population as of 2000 was 1,237.

References

Corregimientos of Herrera Province